Rudolf Horn (born 8 February 1954) is a former Austrian biathlete and cross-country skier. He competed at the 1976 Winter Olympics, the 1980 Winter Olympics and the 1984 Winter Olympics.

Olympic results

Cross-country skiing 
 1976:
 8th, Winter Olympics 4 × 10 kilometres relay (together with Reinhold Feichter, Werner Vogel and Herbert Wachter)
 42nd, Winter Olympics 15 kilometres

Biathlon 
 1980:
 6th, Winter Olympics 4 × 7.5 kilometres relay (together with Alfred Eder, Franz-Josef Weber and Josef Koll)
 26th, Winter Olympics 20 kilometres
 28th, Winter Olympics 10 kilometres
 1984:
 8th, Winter Olympics 4 × 7.5 kilometres relay (together with Alfred Eder, Walter Hörl and Franz Schuler)
 36th, Winter Olympics 20 kilometres
 36th, Winter Olympics 10 kilometres

References

1954 births
Living people
Austrian male cross-country skiers
Olympic biathletes of Austria
Olympic cross-country skiers of Austria
Austrian soldiers
Austrian male biathletes
Cross-country skiers at the 1976 Winter Olympics
Biathletes at the 1980 Winter Olympics
Biathletes at the 1984 Winter Olympics
20th-century Austrian people